Corydalis cava is a species of flowering plant in the family Papaveraceae, native to moist, shady, woodland habitats throughout most of mainland Europe, although commonest in central and southeast Europe.
Its range extends from Spain in the west to Ukraine, Belarus and the Caucasus in the east and as far north as Sweden. It is absent from (though may sometimes be found in a naturalised state in) Iceland, the UK, the Netherlands, Norway, Finland, Russia and Greece.

Description
It is a spring ephemeral—foliage that grows in the spring dies down to its tuberous rootstock in summer. It has long-spurred flowers which appear in spring. The flowers may be mauve, purple, red, or white.

The seeds contain an elaiosome that attracts ants, which transport the seeds into their ant colony. This seed transportation is called myrmecochory.

Toxicity

Many of the species in Corydalis contain alkaloids such as canadine and corydaline, which blocks calcium. The majority of these belong to the isoquinoline alkaloid group. All parts of the plant are alkaloidal but the highest concentrations are present in the hollow root tuber. 

Corydalis cava and some other tuberous species contain the alkaloid bulbocapnine, which is occasionally used in medicine but for which scientific evidence is lacking in regard to correct dosage and side effects.

Gallery

References

cava
Flora of Europe
Ephemeral plants